Information and Consultation of Employees Directive 2002/14/EC is a European Labour Law that requires undertakings to inform and consult employees on significant changes to businesses in a standing procedure, typically called a work council.

See also

European labour law
UK labour law
Information and Consultation of Employees Regulations 2004

European Union labour law
United Kingdom labour law